The Ghizghiț is a right tributary of the river Arieșul Mare in Romania. It flows into the Arieșul Mare in Gârda de Sus.

References

Rivers of Romania
Rivers of Alba County